Radio Pilatus is a private radio station in Central Switzerland. The station started transmission in 1983. The studios are in Lucerne.

Radio Pilatus also covers traffic for most of the Central Switzerland regions to let listeners know of traffic congestion or accidents.

External links
Radio Pilatus

German-language radio stations in Switzerland
Mass media in Lucerne